Listán de Huelva is a white wine grape grown mainly in the province of Huelva, in the region of Andalusia, Spain.

References

White wine grape varieties